Nepenthes philippinensis  is a tropical pitcher plant endemic to the Philippines. It is known from Palawan and the neighbouring Calamian Islands (including Busuanga, Coron, and Culion) and Linapacan, where it grows at 0– above sea level.

Nepenthes wilkiei was described by Matthew Jebb and Martin Cheek in 1998. This taxon was subsequently found to be conspecific with N. philippinensis. Jebb and Cheek suggest that N. philippinensis is more closely related to the Bornean species N. hirsuta, N. hispida, and N. macrovulgaris than it is to N. alata.

Nepenthes philippinensis produces the most concurrent inflorescences of any species in the genus; up to 190 have been recorded on a single plant.

Nepenthes philippinensis has no known natural hybrids. No forms or varieties have been formally described, although a multitude of taxa resembling N. philippinensis are found across the isolated peaks of Palawan.

References

Further reading

 Co, L. & W. Suarez 2012. Nepenthaceae. Co's Digital Flora of the Philippines.
 Cullen, D. & B. Quinn 2012. Exploring Mount Victoria, Central Palawan – revisiting the habitat of N. attenboroughii. Part 1: Mt Victoria – Peak 1 & 2. Victorian Carnivorous Plant Society Journal 105: 6–13.
 Macfarlane, J.M. 1927. The Philippine species of Nepenthes. The Philippine Journal of Science 33(2): 127–140.
 Mann, P. 1998. A trip to the Philippines. Carnivorous Plant Newsletter 27(1): 6–11.
  Mansur, M. 2001.  In: Prosiding Seminar Hari Cinta Puspa dan Satwa Nasional. Lembaga Ilmu Pengetahuan Indonesia, Bogor. pp. 244–253.
 McPherson, S. 2011. N. attenboroughii – a new species of giant pitcher plant from the Philippines. Victorian Carnivorous Plant Society Journal 99: 12–18.
  McPherson, S. & T. Gronemeyer 2008. Die Nepenthesarten der Philippinen Eine Fotodokumentation. Das Taublatt 60(1): 34–78.
 Mey, F.S. 2013. Neotypification of Nepenthes blancoi and description of N. abalata a new species from the Philippines. Strange Fruits: A Garden's Chronicle, February 11, 2013.

Carnivorous plants of Asia
philippinensis
Endemic flora of the Philippines
Flora of Palawan
Plants described in 1908